Mary Hobbs may refer to:

 Mary Anne Hobbs (born 1964), English DJ and music journalist
 Mary Mendenhall Hobbs (1852–1930), American Quaker advocate for women's education, temperance and suffrage